is a former Japanese football player.

Club statistics

References

External links

library.footballjapan.jp

1980 births
Living people
Aichi Gakuin University alumni
Association football people from Nara Prefecture
Japanese footballers
J1 League players
J2 League players
Nagoya Grampus players
Yokohama FC players
Association football goalkeepers